Phaulopsis is a genus of flowering plants belonging to the family Acanthaceae.

Its native range is Africa, Arabian Peninsula, Eastern Himalaya to China and Indo-China.

Species
Species:

Phaulopsis aequivoca 
Phaulopsis angolana 
Phaulopsis barteri 
Phaulopsis ciliata 
Phaulopsis dorsiflora 
Phaulopsis gediensis 
Phaulopsis grandiflora 
Phaulopsis imbricata 
Phaulopsis johnstonii 
Phaulopsis lankesterioides 
Phaulopsis latiloba 
Phaulopsis lindaviana 
Phaulopsis marcelinoi 
Phaulopsis micrantha 
Phaulopsis pulchella 
Phaulopsis sangana 
Phaulopsis savannicola 
Phaulopsis semiconica 
Phaulopsis symmetrica 
Phaulopsis talbotii 
Phaulopsis verticillaris

References

Acanthaceae
Acanthaceae genera